The Arrondissement of Huy is one of the four administrative arrondissements in the Walloon province of Liège, Belgium.

Municipalities

The Administrative Arrondissement of Huy consists of the following municipalities:

 Amay
 Anthisnes
 Burdinne
 Clavier
 Engis
 Ferrières
 Hamoir
 Héron
 Huy

 Marchin
 Modave
 Nandrin
 Ouffet
 Tinlot
 Verlaine
 Villers-le-Bouillet
 Wanze

References 

Huy